Herbort von Fritzlar was a cleric and writer.  He wrote the German-language epic Song of Troy, comprising 18,458 verses in Middle High German, probably around 1190 to 1200.

People from Fritzlar

12th-century German writers
12th-century German clergy